CCS3 can refer to:
 Code Composer Studio version 3, an integrated development environment for embedded systems by Texas Instruments
 TC LID code for St. Stephen Airport